Robert Boyd is a Canadian former film and television director. His credits include the films South of Wawa and The Canadian Conspiracy, as well as episodes of Road to Avonlea and The Kids in the Hall.

External links

Canadian film directors
Canadian television directors
Living people
Year of birth missing (living people)
Place of birth missing (living people)
Canadian Screen Award winners
20th-century Canadian people